Carson Reynolds Blair (born October 18, 1989) is an American former professional baseball catcher. He has played in Major League Baseball (MLB) for the Oakland Athletics.

Career

Boston Red Sox
Blair was drafted by the Boston Red Sox in the 35th round of the 2008 Major League Baseball Draft out of Liberty Christian School in Argyle, Texas. He played in the Red Sox organization until 2014.

Oakland Athletics
Prior to the 2015 season he signed a minor league deal with the Oakland Athletics. Blair was called up to the majors for the first time on September 1, 2015. He made his major league debut on September 6 in a 3-2 loss against the Seattle Mariners. He hit his first home run off of Andrew Faulkner of the Texas Rangers on September 13 in a losing cause for Oakland. He played the first half of the 2016 season in the A's minor league system, and was released on July 15.

Chicago White Sox
On January 17, 2017, Blair signed a minor league contract with the Chicago White Sox. He was released on July 21, 2017.

References

External links

1989 births
Living people
Baseball players from Texas
Major League Baseball catchers
Oakland Athletics players
Gulf Coast Red Sox players
Lowell Spinners players
Greenville Drive players
Salem Red Sox players
Portland Sea Dogs players
Midland RockHounds players
Nashville Sounds players
Vermont Lake Monsters players
People from Denton County, Texas
Sportspeople from the Dallas–Fort Worth metroplex